Kyogle is a town in the Northern Rivers region of northern New South Wales, Australia. It falls within the local government area of Kyogle Council. At the 2016 census, Kyogle had a population of 2,751 people. Kyogle is known as a "gateway" to many national parks including Border Ranges National Park and Toonumbar National Park.

History
It also lies on the banks of the Richmond River. It is the seat of its own shire. Kyogle comes from the Aboriginal Australian 'Bundjalung' word Gayugul, meaning 'Brolga', a reference to the Australian Brolga which is indigenous to the region.

Cattle grazing, dairy farming and forestry are the primary industries. In times past, timber getting was the main reason for settlement in the area, with red cedar and hoop pine the main timber trees.

Railway 
Kyogle station is served by the main North Coast railway line between Sydney and Brisbane. A train from Sydney to Brisbane stops at 2.46am and a train from Brisbane to Sydney stops at 7.53am (only stops if there are booked passengers getting on or off at Kyogle). A short crossing loop used to be located at the passenger station, but when the loop was extended for  -long trains, the crossing loop was relocated to a more suitable — straighter — site outside town.

Further north along the railway line towards Brisbane, located at Cougal, is the Border Loop spiral, where the track loops 360 degrees and eventually passes over itself.  This loop was constructed for trains to climb from the low side (NSW) to the high side (QLD) of the McPherson Range.

In 2012, Kyogle Council made a submission for a twice-daily train service, between Kyogle and Brisbane, which would benefit both the South East Queensland and the Kyogle regions, especially in tourism.  The proposal would, however, require cooperation from both the Queensland and NSW governments, and these governments have yet to act on the proposal.

Population
According to the 2016 census of Population, there were 3,464 people in Kyogle.
 Aboriginal and Torres Strait Islander people made up 4.0% of the population. 
 82.4% of people were born in Australia and 87.4% of people spoke only English at home. 
 The most common responses for religion were No Religion 24.1%, Catholic 22.3% and Anglican 19.1%.

NSW Tidy Towns winner
Kyogle won the "Young Legends" category award at the 2012 Australian Tidy Town Awards. One of the judges, Dick Olesinski, described how Kyogle's community encompasses a diverse range of projects that demonstrate the community's commitment to Tidy Towns and other related environmental and beautification programs, saying "Kyogle's Tidy Towns Committee continues to deliver active and enthusiastic promotion of the town, providing infrastructure and support of community activities."

Sporting heroes 
Dean Ferris - MXGP World Motocross Championship Competitor
David Kennedy - Famous bull rider.
Will Matthews - Current NRL player who has played for the St George Illawarra Dragons & Gold Coast Titans and is currently again contracted to Gold Coast Titans in 2018.
Ken Nagas - Former NRL player who played for the Canberra Raiders, he also represented New South Wales & Australia.
Nigel Roy - Former NRL and Super League footballer for Illawarra Steelers, North Sydney Bears, Northern Eagles, London Broncos.
Shannon Walker - Former Australian rugby sevens and NRL player and currently playing Queensland Cup.
Kerrie Taurima (born Kerrie Perkins on 2 April 1979) Australian long jumper. She had a promising career as a junior athlete, and trained at the Australian Institute of Sport. She won the national long jump title in 2004 and 2005.[1] The following year she won a silver medal in the long jump at the Commonwealth Games.

Sporting clubs 

Kyogle Bowling Club
Kyogle Golf Club
Kyogle Cockies Rugby Union Club
Kyogle Netball Association
Kyogle Pony Club
Kyogle Turkeys Rugby League Club (Junior & Senior teams)
Kyogle Little Athletics
Kyogle Turkeys Touch Football Club
Kyogle Soccer Club
Kyogle Swimming club
Kyogle Tennis Club
Kyogle District Cricket Association.

World Rally Championship 

The 2009 World Rally Championship, also known as the 2009 Rally Australia, passed through the Kyogle area in 2009.

Flooding 

This was the second worst flood in Kyogle on record, after the flood of 1954.

References

External links 

Kyogle Web Community links and information.
Kyogle Council
Kyogle Community Directory community info

Towns in New South Wales
Kyogle Council